Wanchang may refer to the following places in China:

Wanchang, Jilin (万昌), a town in Yongji County, Jilin
Wanchang, Weiyuan County (碗厂), a town in Weiyuan County, Sichuan
Wanchang Township (碗厂乡), a township in Zhaojue County, Sichuan
Wanchang, Yunnan (碗厂), a town in Zhenxiong County, Yunnan

See also
Wangchang (disambiguation)